The 1999–2000 National Cup is the 8th edition of the Vietnamese Cup.

Preliminary round
[Nov 2 and Nov 6]

[following rounds apparently part of group stage]

Round 1
[Nov 13-14]

Round 2
[Dec 22]

[NB: Cong An = Police; Quan Khu = Military Zone; Duong Sat = Railways SC]

1/16 Finals
[Feb ? and Mar 4,5]

1/8 Finals

Vĩnh Long withdrew from league and cup

Quarterfinals 
[May 14 and 19]

Cong An HCMC      3-1 2-2   Cong An Hanoi

[May 15 and 19]

SLNA              2-3 3-3   Long An

[May 15 and 20]

Nam Định          1-1 0-3   Đồng Tháp

[May 17 and 20]

Cang Saigon       1-0 3-0   The Cong

Semifinals

Final

Vietnamese National Cup
Viet
Cup
Cup